Climate change in Cyprus is predicted to lead to rising temperatures (along with other negative effects of climate change) at a swifter rate than many other areas of the planet. Cyprus is an island nation geographically situated in the Middle East, with low levels of rainfall.

Greenhouse gas emissions 

The country plans to expand the incentive scheme for electric cars since there is a lack of charging stations for electric cars.

Impacts on the natural environment

Temperature and weather changes 

Due to location, Cyprus has always enjoyed an unusually high number of sunny days, with the sun shining for an annual average of 75% of daylight hours.

The climate has changed significantly over the 20th century. Measurements taken in the capital city of Nicosia show an increase in average temperature from 18.9 °C at the beginning of the 20th century, to 19.7 °C at its end, an increase of 0.8 °C. According to the Meteorological Service, rainfall has also declined at a rate of 1 mm per year over the 20th century.

Projected increases in temperature range between a minimum increase of 3.6 °C and 5 °C by the end of the century. The number of very hot days on the island is projected to increase by more than two additional weeks per year, with the likely effect of creating an additional 9 days without rainfall per year.

Water resources 
Cyprus is situated in the Eastern Mediterranean and is described as "amongst the geographic areas that are most vulnerable to climate change". Because of the short residence time of waters, the Mediterranean Sea is considered a hot-spot for climate change effects.  According to climate projections, the Mediterranean Sea could become warmer. The decrease in precipitation over the region could lead to more evaporation ultimately increasing the Mediterranean Sea salinity. Because of the changes in temperature and salinity, the Mediterranean Sea may become more stratified by the end of the 21st century, with notable consequences on water circulation and biogeochemistry.

Mitigation and adaptation

Policies and legislation

Paris agreement 

The Paris agreement is a legally international agreement adopted at the COP 21, its main goal is to limit global warming to below 1.5 degrees Celsius, compared to pre-industrial levels. The Nationally Determined Contributions (NDC's) are the plans to fight climate change adapted for each country. Every party in the agreement has different goals based on its own historical climate records and country's circumstances.  All the goals for each country are stated in their NDC. In the case for member countries of the European Union the goals are very similar and the European Union work with a common strategy within the Paris agreement.

See also

 Climate change in Turkey

References

External links
Documents submitted to UNFCCC

Environment of Cyprus
Climate change by country
Climate change adaptation